Lothar Göttsche (born January 21, 1961 in Sonderburg, Denmark) is a German mathematician, known for his work in algebraic geometry.

He is a research scientist at the International Centre for Theoretical Physics in Trieste, Italy. He is also editor for Geometry & Topology.

Biography 
After studying mathematics at the University of Kiel, he received his Dr. rer. nat. under the direction of Friedrich Hirzebruch at the University of Bonn in 1989.

Göttsche was invited as speaker to the International Congress of Mathematicians in Beijing in 2002. 
In 2012 he became a fellow of the American Mathematical Society.

Work 
Göttsche received international acclaim with his formula for the generating function for the Betti numbers of the Hilbert scheme of points on an algebraic surface:

If  is a smooth surface over an algebraically closed field of characteristic , then the generating function for the motives of the Hilbert schemes of  can be expressed in terms of the motivic zeta function by Göttsche's formula

Göttsche is also the author of a celebrated conjecture predicting the number of curves in certain linear systems on algebraic surfaces.

References

External links
Home page of Lothar Göttsche

20th-century German mathematicians
Algebraic geometers
People from Sønderborg Municipality
University of Kiel alumni
University of Bonn alumni
Fellows of the American Mathematical Society
1961 births
Living people
21st-century German mathematicians